Andrea Calcese (1595–1656), also called Ciuccio, was an Italian comic actor of the Baroque era. He is best remembered as one of the fill the role of Pulcinella. He worked under Silvio Fiorillo in Naples. He began reciting verses at the theater at San Giorgio dei Genovesi, adding comic touches. In 1618, he began taking the mask and costume of Pulcinella, and because renown for his talented improvisational recitations. He is said to have been a lawyer prior to becoming a comic actor. He was born in Naples, and died there from the plague in 1656. His pupil was Michele Fracanzani.

References

Sources

Male actors from Naples
Commedia dell'arte
17th-century Italian male actors
Renaissance sculptors
17th-century deaths from plague (disease)
1595 births
1656 deaths
17th-century Neapolitan people